ARA may refer to:

Media and the arts
 American-Romanian Academy of Arts and Sciences
 Artistička Radna Akcija, compilation album released in former Yugoslavia
 Associate of the Royal Academy, denoting membership in the British Royal Academy of Arts
 ARA News, an online Arabic and English language news service focussed on Syrian and Kurdish events

Organisations
 Academic Research Alliance, an organization created to involve students in scientific activities
 Alliance for Retired Americans, a senior citizen organization
 American Relief Administration, a relief mission after World War I
 Amateur Rowing Association, the governing body of rowing in the United Kingdom, now renamed British Rowing
 Amateurs Radio Algeriens, the national amateur radio organization of Algeria
 American Radio Association, a national AFL-CIO affiliated labor union representing U.S. Flag Merchant Marine Licensed Communications and Electronics Officers
 American Railway Association, precursor to the Association of American Railroads
 American Rally Association, governing body of rallying and championship in the United States
 Anti-Racist Action, a network of anti-racist activists
 Anti-Racist Alliance, a defunct anti-racist organisation in the United Kingdom
 Applied Research Associates, a research and engineering company
 Arcade and Attica Railroad, from its reporting mark
 Archives and Records Association, professional body for UK and Irish archivists, archive conservators and records managers
 Assets Recovery Agency, a British agency for the recovery of the proceeds of crime
 Athénée Royal d'Auderghem, a school in Brussels, Belgium
 Australasian Raptor Association, a special interest group of the Royal Australasian Ornithologists Union

Military
 Aerial Rocket Artillery, helicopter artillery units used by the U.S. Army in the Vietnam War mainly to engage ground targets
 Armada de la República Argentina, the Argentine Navy
 Armenian Revolutionary Army, an armed militant group
 Aryan Republican Army, white nationalist criminal group
 Australian Regular Army

Government
 Auckland Regional Authority, a former local government council in New Zealand

Sciences
 Angiotensin II receptor antagonist, more often called angiotensin receptor blocker (ARB)
 Aldosterone receptor antagonist (mineralocorticoid receptor antagonist, that is, antimineralocorticoid)
 Ant-based Routing Algorithm, a wireless mesh network routing protocol; see Swarm intelligence
 AppleTalk Remote Access, a communications protocol
 Audio Random Access, an extension to audio plug-in interfaces
 Arachidonic acid (also AA), as found in breast milk and infant formula
 The Arrow-Pratt measure of absolute risk aversion
 Askaryan Radio Array (ARA), a GZK neutrino detector based on the Askaryan effect and will be positioned in the Antarctic ice sheet

Computer science
 Application release automation

People
 Amedeo Rocco Armentano (1886–1966), Italian esotericist and musician

See also
Ara (disambiguation)